"Margherita" is an Italian ballad song written by Marco Luberti and Riccardo Cocciante, arranged by Vangelis and performed by Riccardo Cocciante. It was the first single from Cocciante's 1976 album Concerto per Margherita.

The song was premiered in the RAI television program Adesso Musica. It peaked at the first place on the Italian singles chart, and is considered as the song which definitely consecrated Cocciante to fame following the success of his 1974 single "Bella senz'anima". According to Luberti, the lyrics were written straight at 4am. 
 
In 1978 Cocciante released Spanish, French and English language versions of the song, respectively titled "Margarita", "Marguerite" and "Just For You". The song was later covered by several artists, including Mina and Fiorella Mannoia.  In 1999 and in 2006, Cocciante performed the song out of competition at the Sanremo Music Festival.

Track listing
7" single –  TPBO 1243  
A. "Margherita" (Marco Luberti, Riccardo Cocciante) – 4:31
B. "Primavera" (Marco Luberti, Riccardo Cocciante) – 4:58

Charts

References

 

1976 singles
1976 songs
Number-one singles in Italy
Riccardo Cocciante songs
Songs written by Riccardo Cocciante
Songs written by Marco Luberti